Katie J. Muth is an American politician serving as a Democratic member of the Pennsylvania State Senate, representing the 44th District. Her district includes portions of northeastern Chester and southwestern Montgomery and Berks Counties. Muth serves in Senate Democratic Leadership as the Senate Democratic Policy Chair.

Political career

Elections

2018 election 
Muth was unopposed in the Democratic primary. In the general election, she defeated incumbent Republican John Rafferty - who had represented the 44th District since 2003 - by a margin of 62,692 to 57,943 (52% to 48%). Her victory was part of the "blue wave" that increased Democratic and female representation in the Pennsylvania General Assembly and Congressional delegation.

Committee assignments
Muth sits on the following committees in the Senate:
 Finance
 Rules and Executive Nominations 
 Environmental Resources and Energy
 State Government
 Veterans Affairs and Emergency Preparedness –- Minority Chair

Political positions 
Muth supports initiatives such as rebate programs to decrease property taxes, along with ending increasing property taxes. She supports increasing taxes for corporations, with an emphasis on the fossil fuel industry. She supports state-sponsored healthcare for all.

2019 budget debate 
During a budget debate in June 2019, Senator Muth took the floor and read a letter from a disabled constituent who relies on the PA General Assistance Program. Throughout her reading, Republican Majority Leader Jake Corman of Bellefonte loudly raised a point of order which was not recognized by the president (Democratic Lieutenant Governor John Fetterman). The Republican-controlled Senate voted against renewing the program 26–24.

2020 presidential endorsement 
On November 8, 2019 Muth tweeted her official endorsement of Senator Elizabeth Warren in her bid for President.

PSERS 
Muth made headlines when she sued Pennsylvania’s largest public pension system amid a federal investigation into aspects of the agency’s undertakings, saying agency officials have refused to share documents with her, even though she is a board member. Muth’s lawsuit said board members are being asked to vote on approximately $1 billion in investments at Thursday’s meeting, “yet attempts to obtain information, data and documents that in her view could better inform” those decisions were rejected. The Associated Press has previously reported that subpoenas from federal investigators center on the pension system's purchases of parcels of land in downtown Harrisburg and its calculations about the fund's investment performance that help determine the balance of payments into the system by taxpayers and school employees.

Education 
Muth received a B.S. degree in Athletic Training from the Pennsylvania State University in 2011 and graduated from A.T. Still University of Health Sciences in Mesa, Arizona with a M.S. in Athletic Training in 2013.

References

External links 
 State Senator Muth's website 
 Katie for State Senator Twitter profile
 Project Vote Smart - Senator Katie Muth (PA) profile

Pennsylvania State University alumni
People from Montgomery County, Pennsylvania
Democratic Party Pennsylvania state senators
Living people
Women state legislators in Pennsylvania
1983 births
21st-century American politicians
21st-century American women politicians
Politicians from Montgomery County, Pennsylvania